Medicago orbicularis is a plant species found throughout the Mediterranean basin and along the European Black Sea coast. It forms a symbiotic relationship with the bacterium Sinorhizobium medicae, which is capable of nitrogen fixation. Common names include blackdisk medick, button clover, button medick, and round-fruited medick.

Gallery

References

External links 
 International Legume Database & Information Services

orbicularis
Flora of Lebanon
Flora of Lebanon and Syria
Flora of Malta